Oravské Veselé is a village and municipality in Námestovo District in the Žilina Region of northern Slovakia.

History
In historical records the village was first mentioned in 1629.

Geography
The municipality lies at an altitude of 755 metres and covers an area of 41.217 km2. It has a population of about 2794 people.

External links
https://web.archive.org/web/20080111223415/http://www.statistics.sk/mosmis/eng/run.html 
 Goral dialect from linguistic point of view – covering Oravske Vesele (in Slovak)
 Overall information about dialect of Oravske Vesele (in Slovak)

Villages and municipalities in Námestovo District